Thecadactylus oskrobapreinorum is a species of gecko. It was first described in 2011 from Sint Maarten in the Lesser Antilles. Previous to this it was thought that the only species of turnip-tailed gecko present in the Lesser Antilles was Thecadactylus rapicauda, but the new species is readily distinguishable by its boldly spotted appearance. The specific name honours the two German herpetologists Maciej Oskroba and Stephan Prein who first studied this gecko.

Description

It is distinguished from other members of the genus by the distinct pattern of numerous irregular but sharply delineated black markings on its dorsal surface which is otherwise a pale greyish-yellow or greyish-olive. It has adhesive toe-pads on its feet.

Distribution and habitat
Thecadactylus oskrobapreinorum is known only from the Caribbean island of Saint Martin. The holotype came from Sint Maarten, part of the Kingdom of the Netherlands, but the gecko is also known from the French overseas Collectivity of Saint Martin. The gecko is found on the lower parts of the trunks of trees in forests and near forest edges. It is active at night.

References

Geckos
Lizards of the Caribbean
Reptiles of Saint Martin (island)
Reptiles described in 2011